Black Rock, Arizona is located just south of the Utah–Arizona state line in the extreme northwest area of the state.  It is an area of the Arizona Strip in the north Mojave Desert just off Interstate 15.  The area is accessed by the Black Rock Road Exit just outside the Virgin River Gorge, which is to the south.  The area is managed by the United States Bureau of Land Management.  The area is used for off road vehicle recreation, hiking, photography, and as an informal rest stop for long haul truckers.

External links
 American Southwest.net 
 Arizona Roads.com 
 ATV Utah.com 

Protected areas of Mohave County, Arizona
Bureau of Land Management areas in Arizona